The Institution of Engineers, Bangladesh, commonly referred to as IEB, is the national professional organisation of engineers in Bangladesh. It is registered under the Societies Registration Act (1860) of the country. Within the country, it has 18 centers and 31 sub-centers. It has 10 'overseas chapter' in different countries of the world, namely: Australia, Kuwait, Malaysia, Oman, Qatar, Saudi Arabia, Singapore, Thailand, United Arab Emirates and the United States.

History 
After the Bangladesh Liberation War of 1971, the Institution of Engineers, Pakistan was renamed as the Institution of Engineers, Bangladesh, which was founded in 1948, after the end of the British colonial rule in the Indian subcontinent; with its headquarters at Dhaka in Bangladesh.

Around the 1947, a number of senior engineers took initiative to establish a forum of engineers in profession. Soon after, it got its foundation stone laid on 7 May 1948, at Ramna in Dhaka city.

Divisions 
IEB has seven divisions within it. They are:
 Agriculture Engineering Division
 Chemical Engineering Division
 Civil Engineering Division
 Computer Engineering Division (established in 2011)
 Electrical Engineering Division
 Mechanical Engineering Division
 Textile Engineering Division

Organs 
IEB has four independent organs within it. They are:
 Board of Accreditation for Engineering and Technical Education
 Bangladesh Professional Engineers Registration Board
 Engineering Staff College Bangladesh
 Occupational Safety Board of Bangladesh

Membership 
Every professional engineer of Bangladesh is invited to join the Institution of Engineers, Bangladesh (IEB). As of 2020, it has over 41,500 members.

IEB membership has three categories – Fellowship, Membership and Associate Membership. These categories are based on the experience of the member in the engineering field.

Members of all three categories are entitled to use the title "Engr." before their names.

Board of Accreditation for Engineering and Technical Education (BAETE) 

Board of Accreditation for Engineering and Technical Education (BAETE) is a non-governmental body that provides accreditation for engineering programs within the jurisdiction of Bangladesh. It operates as an independent and autonomous agency of the Institution of Engineers, Bangladesh (IEB).

BAETE represents the Institution of Engineers, Bangladesh, a provisional signatory of Washington Accord, an international accreditation agreement for undergraduate professional engineering academic degrees. BAETE is also a full member of Network of Accreditation Bodies for Engineering Education in Asia (NABEEA). BAETE also represents IEB in The Federation of Engineering Institutions of Asia and the Pacific (FEIAP).

References

External links 
 Official Website

Engineering societies
Professional associations based in Bangladesh
Science and technology in Bangladesh
Organizations established in 1948
Accreditation organizations
Professional titles and certifications
Engineering education
Bangladeshi engineers